Uraan is a 1995 Pakistani television series based on PIA written and directed by Shahid Nadeem and produced by Muhammad Azeem.

Synopsis 
The story revolves around certain events related to lives of passengers and airline professionals like cabin crew and pilots.

Cast 
 Shakeel as Captain Jamshed
 Abid Ali as Waqar
 Savera Nadeem as Faiza
 Faryal Gohar as Amira
 Madeeha Gauhar as Rehana
 Saba Hameed as Neelam
 Naima Khan as Aapa
 Ashraf Khan as Akhtar
 Jazba Sultan as Faiza's Mother
 Nabeel as Khalid
 Nasreen Qureshi as Amira's Mother
 Sohail Asghar as Akbar Ali
 Zulqarnain Haider as Abdul Baqi 
 Sarfraz Rana as Ameen
 Asim Bukhari as Darwesh Kamal
 Ismat Tahira as Nomi's Grandmother
 Tamanna as Bibi Ji
 Nauman Ijaz as Adnan
 Iffat Rahim as Adnan's Wife
 Hameed Sheikh as Bahadur
 Shaiyanne Malik as Fashion Photographer
 Wakeel Farooqi as Resham's Father
 Aslam Shaheen as Sehwat
 Resham as Plane Passenger
 Zahid Qureshi as Masood
 Ajlal Bukhari as Shumail
 Ayesha Alam as Air Hostess
 Qaisar Ali as Plane Passenger
 Mehmood Aslam as Khanzada
 Javed Babar as Babar
 Shahnaz Khawaja as Shani
 Qavi Khan as Nawab Hussain
 Adnan Qavi as Mansoor

Production

Filming 
The principal shooting of the serial took place in Karachi and for some episodes shooting took place at different places including Paris, New York City, London, Kathmandu and Nairobi.

Stage play 
Shahid Nadeem also wrote a stage play about Uraan and the play was screened at Ajoka Theatre.

References

External links 
 

1990s Pakistani television series
Pakistan Television Corporation original programming
Pakistani drama television series
Urdu-language television shows